William Taylor House may refer to:

 William Taylor House (Resaca, Georgia), listed on the National Register of Historic Places (NRHP) in Gordon County
 William Taylor House (Becknerville, Kentucky), listed on the NRHP in Clark County
 William Taylor House (Middleport, New York), listed on the NRHP in Niagara County

See also
Taylor House (disambiguation)